Richard Crump is a former Canadian Football League running back who played for three different teams from 1975 through 1981. For his career, Crump finished with 3,854 yards rushing and 200 pass receptions. Crump played in the USFL from 1983 through 1985 with the Boston Breakers, New Orleans Breakers and Orlando Renegades where he rushed for 1,167 yards. Crump led the Breakers in 1983 with 990 yards rushing.

References 

1955 births
Living people
American players of Canadian football
American football running backs
Canadian football running backs
Winnipeg Blue Bombers players
Calgary Stampeders players
Ottawa Rough Riders players
Boston/New Orleans/Portland Breakers players
Washington Federals/Orlando Renegades players
Northeastern State RiverHawks football players
Players of American football from Georgia (U.S. state)
People from Cairo, Georgia